Plectocarpon is a genus of lichens in the family Lecanographaceae.

Species
Plectocarpon aequatoriale 
Plectocarpon bunodophori 
Plectocarpon concentricum 
Plectocarpon coppinsii 
Plectocarpon cristalliferum 
Plectocarpon diedertzianum 
Plectocarpon dimorphosporum 
Plectocarpon dirinariae 
Plectocarpon galapagoense 
Plectocarpon gallowayi 
Plectocarpon gayanum 
Plectocarpon hypogymniae 
Plectocarpon latisporum 
Plectocarpon leuckertii 
Plectocarpon lichenum 
Plectocarpon melanohaleae 
Plectocarpon obtectum 
Plectocarpon opegraphoideum 
Plectocarpon parmeliarum 
Plectocarpon parmotrematis 
Plectocarpon peltigerae 
Plectocarpon pseudoleuckertii 
Plectocarpon ramalinae 
Plectocarpon scrobiculatae 
Plectocarpon serusiauxii 
Plectocarpon stereocaulicola 
Plectocarpon sticticola 
Plectocarpon syncesioides 
Plectocarpon tibellii 
Plectocarpon triebeliae 
Plectocarpon usneaustralis 
Plectocarpon venustum 
Plectocarpon violaceum

References

Arthoniomycetes
Lichen genera
Taxa described in 1825
Taxa named by Antoine Laurent Apollinaire Fée
Arthoniomycetes genera